During most of the Joseon Dynasty, Korea was divided into eight provinces (do;).  The eight provinces' boundaries remained unchanged for about 480 years from 1413 to 1895, and formed a geographic paradigm that is still reflected today in the Korean Peninsula's administrative divisions, dialects, and regional distinctions. The names of all eight provinces are still preserved today, in one form or another. These eight historical provinces form both North and South Korea, and are not to be confused with the provinces that make up South Korea or North Korea.

History

Provinces before 1895
In 1413 (the 13th year of the reign of King Jeongjong), the northeastern boundary of Korea was extended to the Tumen River.  The country was reorganized into eight provinces: Chungcheong, Gangwon, Gyeonggi, Gyeongsang, Jeolla, P'unghae (renamed Hwanghae in 1417), P'yŏngan, and Yŏnggil (eventually renamed Hamgyŏng in 1509).

Districts of 1895-96
For almost 500 years, the eight-province system remained virtually unchanged.  In 1895 (the 32nd year of the reign of King Gojong), the five-century-old provincial system was abolished.  On May 26 of that year—as part of the Gabo Reform—the country was redivided into 23 districts, each named for the city or county that was its capital.

(Each district name in the following list links to the article on the province from which the district was formed, and where more detailed information on the district is provided):

Andong
Chuncheon
Chungju
Daegu
Dongnae
Gangneung
Gongju
Haeju
Hamhŭng
Hanseong
Hongju
Incheon
Jeju
Jeonju
Jinju
Kaesŏng
Kanggye
Kapsan
Kyŏngsŏng
Naju
Namwon
P'yŏngyang
Ŭiju

Restored provinces of 1896

The new system of districts did not last long, however, as one year later, on August 4, 1896, the former eight provinces were restored, with five of them (Chungcheong, Gyeongsang, Jeolla, Hamgyŏng, and P'yŏngan), being divided into north and south halves, to form a total of 13 provinces. This structure remained unchanged through the entire lifetime of the Korean Empire (1897–1910) and the Japanese Colonial Period (1910–1945). Since the end of World War II and the division of Korea in 1945, special cities and administrative regions and a handful of new provinces have been added in both the South and North.

Cultural significance
The boundaries between the eight provinces for the most part followed rivers, mountain chains, and other natural boundaries, and consequently corresponded closely to dialect and cultural divisions.  Because of this natural fit between the provincial boundaries and the "real world," most of the provincial boundaries and names have survived in one form or another down to today, and most Koreans are keenly aware of the regional and dialect distinctions that still exist.

For example, a regional rivalry (akin to that between the Northeast United States and Southern United States) exists between Gyeongsang and Jeolla residents, sites of the ancient kingdoms of Silla and Baekje respectively, due to historic, social, economic, and political differences, some of which have continued into the present day in more muted form. Most of the traditional provinces also had alternative regional names which are still used today (especially Honam, Yeongdong, and Yeongnam), at least in speech, if not on paper.

Modern-day usage
The term Paldo ("Eight Provinces") is itself often used as a shorthand to denote Korea as a whole, or to describe the traditional folk culture of Korea's regions.  Thus, one sometimes finds such expressions as:
Paldo kimchi in reference to the many varieties of kimchi unique to particular regions of Korea;
Paldo Arirang to denote the hundreds of regional versions of the popular folk song Arirang; and
Paldo sori to broadly refer to the diversity of folk music (sori; "sounds") across Korea.

Cf. the four Provinces of Ireland—where reference to the ancient provinces is used to talk of the entire island of Ireland.

Names
Except Gyeonggi (see note 3 below), each province took its name from the initial Hanja (Sino-Korean characters) of two of its principal cities.  The origin of each province's name is detailed in the table below.

Table of provinces
The table below lists the eight provinces in romanized spelling, Hangul and Hanja; the origin of their names; their capitals, dialects, and regional names; and the 13 provinces that replaced them in 1896.  (The capitals and regional names are as of the mid 19th century.  Since they were not official, other regional names were also used, but the ones in the table are the most widely used or representative.)

See also
 Administrative divisions of North Korea
 Administrative divisions of South Korea
 Korean dialects
 Provinces of Korea
 Regions of Korea
 Special cities of North Korea
 Special cities of South Korea
 For comparison, see:
 Provinces of France
 Provinces of Ireland
 Provinces of Japan

Notes
1. Pronounced "Ho-suh," not "Ho-zay-oh," as the spelling might suggest.

2. "Gwandong" is the name for the region as a whole, with "Yeongseo" denoting the western half of the province and "Yeongdong" the eastern half.  "Yeongdong" is used more often than either of the other two terms, however, especially in reference to railway and road arteries that cross through Gangwon, connecting the Seoul and Yeongdong regions.

3. The province's name literally means "area within a 500-li (200-km) radius" (gi) of the "capital" (Gyeong), referring to the royal capital Hanseong (modern-day Seoul).  The regional name "Gijeon" is obsolete.  The 20th-century term "Sudogwon" ("Capital Region") is used today to denote the Seoul-Incheon conurbation and that part of Gyeonggi Province that forms part of the same built-up, urban area.

4. "Kwanbuk" was used to designate either the province as whole, or only the northern part thereof.  In the latter case, "Kwannam" was then used to denote the southern part of the province.

5. The modern-day division of the province into North and South did not occur until 1954.

6. The initial "n" in "Naju" is pronounced as "l" (lower-case "L") when it comes after another consonant; the final "n" in the "Jeon" of "Jeonju" is then assimilated to an "l" sound.

7. The distinctive Jeju Dialect is used on Jeju Island, which became a separate province in 1946.

External links
 South Korean government page on Korea's traditional provincial and regional names 
 Article on the eight provinces, and the 23 districts and 13 provinces that replaced them 
 Article on the 1895 changes to administrative divisions (includes a table listing the 13 post-1896 provinces) 
 Seoul City history article on Hanseong and 22 other late 19th-century districts (includes a detailed list of all the counties into which the 23 districts were divided) 

Joseon dynasty
Provinces of Korea
Korea